George Arthur Hollis (17 April 1868 – 20 March 1944) was a British Anglican bishop. He was bishop of Taunton (a suffragan bishop in the Diocese of Bath and Wells) from 1931 to 1944.

Early life
Hollis was born on 17 April 1868. He was educated at Keble College, Oxford.

Ordained ministry
Hollis was ordained in the Church of England in 1894. He began his ecclesiastical career with a curacy at St James Wednesbury, followed by a spell as Perpetual Curate of St Bartholomew  Armley. After this he was Vicar of Headingley and then the principal of Wells Theological College, before a 14-year stint as bishop of Taunton.

Personal life
He married Mary Margaret Church (1874-1941), herself the daughter of an Anglican minister, at Wells Cathedral on 5 July 1898. Their son Christopher was MP for Devizes from 1945 to 1955, and another son Roger was director general of MI5 from 1956 to 1965. Of grandchildren: Adrian Hollis, Roger's son, was a chess champion and Classics don; while another is, like George, a bishop: Christopher's son, Crispian was the Roman Catholic Bishop of Portsmouth from 1989 to 2012.

Death
He died on 20 March 1944.

References

External links

1868 births
Alumni of Keble College, Oxford
Bishops of Taunton
1944 deaths